Luv Virus is the first EP by South Korean girl group SKarf. This is also their first album release after their member changes during 2012 and it was released on May 31, 2013. The EP contains a total of 5 tracks with the title track titled Luv Virus.

Background and release
On May 19, it was revealed that Skarf would be making their comeback on May 28, 2013 with their first mini album after the member changes. On May 31, 2013, the full music video was also uploaded onto the same YouTube channel and the EP was released on the same day.

Composition
The title track of the EP, Luv Virus and the third track Anymore is composed by Lee Ki and hitmaker Seo Young Bae, whom had composed Ailee's Heaven, Orange Caramel's Lipstick and also Skarf's My Love from their debut single. The second song Bye Bye Bye is composed by  Heo Sung Jin, fourth song Sunny Day is composed by Seo Jung Mo and the fifth song is composed by C.NO which had previously composed songs for NU'EST.

Track list

Chart

Release history

References

External links
 
Alpha Entertainment official site

Korean-language songs
Korean-language EPs